Rhopobota ustomaculana, the Loch Rannoch tortrix or Rannoch bell, is a moth of the family Tortricidae. It is found in most of Europe, east to the eastern part of the Palearctic realm, where it has been recorded from China (Anhui, Jiangxi, Hunan, Sichuan, Guizhou, and Tibet) and Japan.

The wingspan is about 13 mm. Adults are on wing from June to July. They fly during the afternoon and evening.

The larvae feed on Vaccinium vitis-idaea. They spin together the leaves of their host plant, feeding on the upper parenchyma. The species overwinters in this stage.

References

External links
Fauna Europaea
UKmoths

Moths described in 1831
Eucosmini
Moths of Japan
Moths of Europe